Back country may refer to:

Backcountry, a remote, isolated, undeveloped geographic area
Back Country, a live CD/DVD released by Five for Fighting